Monument to the Revolution  is a World War II memorial sculpture by Dušan Džamonja, located at Mrakovica, one of the highest peaks of Kozara mountain, Bosnia and Herzegovina. It is dedicated to the fierce battle and 2,500 Yugoslav partisan fighters and 68,500 predominantly Serb civilians killed or deported to Ustaše concentration camps during the German-Ustaše-Hungarian Kozara Offensive from June to July 1942.

The initiative for the monument's construction began in 1969 and Dušan Džamonja won the first prize for his project. Construction of the monument was completed in 1972.

Džamonja himself described the monument as an interplay of light and darkness; this cylindrical-shaped monument is composed of twenty vertical segments, each being characterized by deep-set concrete pillars (positives) and hollows (negatives). While negatives symbolize death, positives represent victory and life. Horizontally-positioned concrete blocks symbolize enemy forces who are trying to destroy life and victory but are unsuccessful.

Other parts of the memorial complex include a museum and the memorial wall with the names of 9,921 Yugoslav partisans killed in battles on Kozara during World War II in Yugoslavia.

See also
Battle of Kozara
List of World War II monuments and memorials in Bosnia and Herzegovina

References

External links

 Spomenik Database - Kozara historic & informational resource

Buildings and structures completed in 1972
K
1972 sculptures
Buildings and structures in Republika Srpska
K
K